Bjørn & Okay was a Danish pop group formed in 1968, and fronted by singer and bass player Bjørn Hansen. Their lineup has changed throughout the years, with Hansen remaining as the main figure. Presently, the band is made up of Hansen, guitarist Erik Madsen, keyboard player Svend Aage Studsgaard, and drummer Benny Jensen.

The band has had a string of hits, notably "Du og jeg", "Den gule flyver", "Tro, håb og kærlighed" and "Bind dit gule hårbånd".

Hansen's son Johnny Hansen is also a musician; he is a member of the dansband Kandis.

Discography

Albums
(selective)
2003: Gæstealbummet (DEN: #10)
2004: 100 go'e med (DEN: #15)
2005: 40 år / 40 Hits (DEN: #33)

External links
Official website

Danish musical groups